The Torrent is a Canadian drama film, directed by Simon Lavoie and released in 2012. An adaptation of Anne Hébert's novella Le Torrent, the film centres on the life of François (played by Anthony Therrien as a child and Victor Andrés Trelles Turgeon as an adult), a man who was raised by his devoutly religious and abusive mother Claudine (Dominique Quesnel). Left deaf when his refusal to obey her demand that he enter the seminary to become a Catholic priest led Claudine to hit him on the head, he has continued to live in rural isolation, and struggles to establish human connection when he purchases Amica (Laurence Leboeuf), a woman being sold into slavery who is eerily similar to his mother in her youth.

The film premiered at the Festival du nouveau cinéma in October 2012.

The film received six Prix Jutra nominations at the 15th Jutra Awards in 2013, for Best Actor (Trelles Turgeon), Best Actress (Quesnel), Best Art Direction (Éric Barbeau), Best Cinematography (Mathieu Laverdière), Best Original Music (Normand Corbeil) and Best Sound (Luc Boudrias, Marcel Chouinard and Patrice Leblanc).

Plot summary

Cast
 Victor Andrés Trelles Turgeon as François
 Laurence Leboeuf as Amica / Claudine (jeune)
 Dominique Quesnel as Claudine
 Anthony Therrien as François (enfant)
 Marco Bacon as Colporteur
 Roger Blay as Clochard
 Normand Canac-Marquis as Proviseur
 Aubert Pallascio as Vieil instituteur
 Martin Desgagné as  instituteur

References

External links
 

2012 films
Canadian drama films
Films based on Canadian novels
Films directed by Simon Lavoie
Films scored by Normand Corbeil
Films set in Quebec
French-language Canadian films
2010s Canadian films